The Leadership Quarterly is a bimonthly peer-reviewed multidisciplinary social science journal. It is dedicated to the scientific study of leadership. The journal has a broad focus and publishers papers from various fields of social science (psychology, economics, political science, sociology) as well as of biological science (e.g., evolutionary psychology). The journal also publishes methodological advances.

The journal was established in 1990 by JAI Press. It is currently published by Elsevier, which acquired JAI Press in 1998. The current editor-in-chief is John Antonakis (University of Lausanne). According to the Journal Citation Reports, the journal has a 2020 impact factor of 10.517 which puts it in the first quartile in management (11 out of 226 journals) and applied psychology (4 out of 83). It has a CiteScore of 13.200 (akin to a 3-year impact factor). According to various journal quality lists, The Leadership Quarterly is highly ranked. Its acceptance rate is historically below 10%, and in the latest editorial it was reported to be 7% 

Former editors include:

 Leanne E. Atwater, University of Houston, USA, 2010-2016
 Michael D. Mumford, University of Oklahoma, USA, 2005-2010
 James G. Hunt, Texas Tech University, USA, 1999-2004
 Francis Yammarino, State University of New York at Binghamton, USA, 1992-1998
 Henry L. Tosi, Jr., University of Florida, 1991-1992
 Robert J. House, University of Pennsylvania, 1991-1992
 Bernard M. Bass, State University of New York at Binghamton, 1990

Awards 
The journal was recently distinguished by one of its recent articles, which won the 2018 Ig Nobel prize in Economics.

References

External links

Multidisciplinary social science journals
Business and management journals
Applied psychology journals
Leadership studies
Publications established in 1990
Bimonthly journals
Elsevier academic journals
English-language journals